Newcastle Roller Derby League (NRDL) is a flat track roller derby league founded in 2009, based in Newcastle, New South Wales. Their representative team is the Dockyard Dames, while their three home teams are the Harbour Hellcats, the Fort Smashleys and the Bogey Rollers.

League History 
From its inception in early 2009, by mid-2010 the league had more than 100 skaters.

Susy Pow, a skater from the league, was selected to skate for Team Australia at the 2011 Roller Derby World Cup.

In February 2018, Newcastle became a member league of the WFTDA Apprentice Program, and graduated to full membership early in 2019.

Teams

Home Teams
The league has three in-house teams (home teams) who participate in intraleague competitions: the Fort Smashleys, Harbour Hellcats and the Bogey Rollers.

Created in 2011, the Fort Smashleys and Harbour Hellcats are the league's original in-house teams, with the Bogey Rollers being added in 2013. Harbour Hellcats won the first four seasons of the NRDL in-house competition, while the Fort Smashleys won their first season competition in 2013 against newcomers the Bogey Rollers. The name "Fort Smashleys" is a play on Fort Scratchley, a museum and former coastal defence site on the local harbour.

Travel Team
The Dockyard Dames are the Representative team for NRDL, and consists of the best of the best of NRDL players.

The Dockyard Dames have played teams from all around Australia and New Zealand, including Victorian Roller Derby League, Sydney Roller Derby League, Pirate City Rollers, Northern Brisbane Rollers and many more along the way.

The Dockyard Dames have finished third in the Eastern Region Roller Derby competition for four years in a row. Starting in 2010, the league have regularly participated in the Great Southern Slam, a tournament developed and run by Adelaide Roller Derby, which brings together leagues from Australia and New Zealand in competition.

Interleague competition

2010

2011

2012

2013

Intraleague competition

Season Overview

Season 1 (2011)

Season 2 (2011)

Season 3 (2012)

Season 4 (2012)

Season 5 (2013)

See also

 List of roller derby leagues

References

External links
 Newcastle Roller Derby League website

Roller derby leagues in Australia
Roller derby leagues established in 2009
Sport in Newcastle, New South Wales
Sports teams in New South Wales
Women's Flat Track Derby Association Apprentice
2009 establishments in Australia